The three-act structure is a model used in narrative fiction that divides a story into three parts (acts), often called the Setup, the Confrontation, and the Resolution. It was popularized by Syd Field in his 1979 book Screenplay: The Foundations of Screenwriting. Based on his recommendation that a play have a "beginning, middle, and end," the structure has been falsely attributed to Aristotle, who in fact argued for a two-act structure consisting of a "complication" and "denouément" split by a peripeteia.

Dramatic question 

As the story moves along, the plot usually progresses in such a way as to pose a yes or no question, the major dramatic question. For example, Will the boy get the girl?  Will the hero save the day?  Will the detective solve the mystery?  Will the criminal be caught by law enforcement and brought to justice?  Will the protagonist be murdered by the fugitive?  This question must be answered in the climax of the story. The answer is often yes; no; maybe; yes, but...; or no, and what's more...

Structure 
The first act, or opening narration, is usually used for exposition, to establish the main characters, their relationships, and the world they live in. Later in the first act, a dynamic incident occurs, known as the inciting incident, or catalyst, that confronts the main character (the protagonist). The protagonist's attempts to deal with this incident lead to a second and more dramatic situation, known as the first plot point, which (a) signals the end of the first act, (b) ensures life will never be the same again for the protagonist and (c) raises a dramatic question that will be answered in the climax of the film. The dramatic question should be framed in terms of the protagonist's call to action, (Will X recover the diamond? Will Y get the girl? Will Z capture the killer?).

The second act, also referred to as rising action, typically depicts the protagonist's attempt to resolve the problem initiated by the first turning point, only to find themselves in ever worsening situations. Part of the reason protagonists seem unable to resolve their problems is because they do not yet have the skills to deal with the forces of antagonism that confront them. They must not only learn new skills but arrive at a higher sense of awareness of who they are and what they are capable of, in order to deal with their predicament, which in turn changes who they are. This is referred to as character development or a character arc. This cannot be achieved alone and they are usually aided and abetted by mentors and co-protagonists.

The third act features the resolution of the story and its subplots. The climax is the scene or sequence in which the main tensions of the story are brought to their most intense point and the dramatic question answered, leaving the protagonist and other characters with a new sense of who they really are.

See also 
 Act (drama)
 Dramatic structure

References

External links 
 What’s Wrong With The Three Act Structure by former WGA director James Bonnet, via filmmakeriq.com
 What’s Right With The Three Act Structure by Yves Lavandier, author of Writing Drama and Constructing a Story

Plot (narrative)
Filmmaking
Narratology
Screenwriting